Legion of Death may refer to:

 The Legion of Death, a 1918 American drama film directed by Tod Browning.
 Legion of Death (military unit), a Slovenian anti-Communist militia in the Second World War.